Spilarctia reticulata is a moth in the family Erebidae. It was described by Walter Rothschild in 1933. It is found in New Britain.

References

External References

Spilosoma reticulata at BHL

Moths described in 1933
reticulata